Huyan Zhuo is a fictional character in Water Margin, one of the Four Great Classical Novels of Chinese literature. Nicknamed "Double Clubs", hə ranks eighth among the 36 Heavenly Spirits (天罡), the first third of the 108 Stars of Destiny.

Background
Huyan Zhuo is descended from Huyan Zan, a general in the early years of the Song dynasty famous for guarding the northern frontier from Liao. Like his ancestor, Huyan Zhuo is a brave and smart warrior in the Song imperial army. His weapon is a pair of hefty steel clubs, which earn him the nickname "Double Clubs". In battles he flies a black war flag and rides a black stallion, a gift from Emperor Huizong.

Chain-linked armoured cavalry formation
Huyan Zhuo‘s name is brought up when the Song imperial court discusses how to quell the outlaws of Liangshan Marsh after they defeated and killed Gao Lian, the prefect of Gaotangzhou. Grand Marshal Gao Qiu, who is the cousin of Gao Lian, recommends Huyan to Emperor Huizong, saying he is the man for the job. Huyan is summoned from his military post at Runing Commandery (present-day Runan County, Henan) to the imperial capital Dongjing (東京; present-day Kaifeng, Henan). The emperor appoints him the chief commander of the mission, with Han Tao and Peng Qi as his lieutenants. He also receives a black brawny stallion from the emperor.

In his first encounter with Liangshan, Huyan Zhuo loses Peng Qi, who is captured by Hu Sanniang and won over by Song Jiang.  Huyan then sends out his special cavalry consisting of groups of armour-clad horses linked by iron chains. The combined might of the horses charging forward overwhelms the force of Liangshan. Song Jiang and his men hole themselves up, protected by the marsh, to work out how to beat the cavalry. Meanwhile, Huyan requests the court to send Ling Zhen, an artillery officer and cannon maker, over to shell Liangshan. Ling's cannons hit the far shores of the marsh, striking fear among the outlaws. Liangshan sends some of its best swimmers to lure Ling into the marsh and seizes him. Ling too joins Liangshan, succumbing to Song Jiang's warm treatment.

Tang Long suggests to Song Jiang that his cousin Xu Ning, a infantry lance instructor in Dongjing, could annihilate Huyan's cavalry. After Shi Qian stole an impenetrable armour of Xu, a precious ancestral heirloom, Tang tricks the instructor to pursue the elusive thief until he comes to the vicinity of Liangshan and is drugged. Finding himself trapped, Xu also becomes a chieftain. He trains some of Liangshan's foot soldiers (infantry) in the use of the hooked lance. The weapon topples Huyan's cavalry, causing his army to collapse. Han Tao also defects after being captured.

Battle of Qingzhou
Defeated by Liangshan, Huyan Zhuo dare not return to Dongjing. He heads to Qingzhou (in present-day Shandong) alone, hoping to redeem himself under the local governor Murong Yanda. The outlaws from Mount Peach Blossom steal his horse from the stable when he puts up in an inn. Reaching Qingzhou (or Qing prefecture, 青州), he gets Murong‘s approval to attack Mount Peach Blossom, whose chieftains are Li Zhong and Zhou Tong. Murong also expects him to stamp out the other outlaws of Mount White Tiger and Mount Twin Dragons. Twin Dragons‘ Lu Zhishen, Yang Zhi and Wu Song are formidable fighters, but the other two strongholds are easily beaten. Huyan even captures Kong Ming of Mount White Tiger.

Finding Huyan Zhuo a tough opponent, the three strongholds turn to Liangshan Marsh for help. Huyan hence faces off four bands. Finally Song Jiang lures him into an ambush and captures him. Song again exercises his charm and wins the heart of the general. Huyan then tricks Murong Yanda to open the gate of Qingzhou. After Qin Ming cut down the governor, the outlaws plunder the city.

Life at Liangshan

The Song court sends Guan Sheng on a mission to wipe out Liangshan. Huyan Zhuo comes to Guan's camp claiming that he has reluctantly joined the bandits and now wants to clear his name. He dupes Guan to launch a night raid on Song Jiang‘s camp. Guan is trapped and pulled down his horse. He also defects swayed by Song's averment that Liangshan is composed of reluctant rebels.

Campaigns and death 
Huyan Zhuo is appointed as one of the Five Tiger Generals of the Liangshan cavalry after the 108 Stars of Destiny came together in what is called the Grand Assembly. He participates in the campaigns against the Liao invaders and rebel forces in Song territory following amnesty from Emperor Huizong for Liangshan.

Huyan Zhuo survives the series of campaigns. He is restored to his former position of general. Years later, he dies in a battle fighting the Jurchen invaders. Northern China was conquered by the Jurchens in early twelfth century, who set up the Jin dynasty, driving the Song court to rule only southern China. Huyan's death in the hands of Wuzhu, a Jurchen prince, is portrayed in the novel General Yue Fei.

References
 
 
 
 
 
 
 

36 Heavenly Spirits
Fictional characters from Shanxi